Iskanwaya is a pre-Columbian sacred site, situated on a mountain ridge above the Llica River in Bolivia, 325 km north of La Paz. In its extension and its age Iskanwaya surpasses Machu Picchu in Peru, but it is less well preserved.

Location 
The sacred site of Iskanwaya is found on the edge of the Cordillera Real, 250 m above the Llica River and 1,672 meters above sea level. The site is located near Aucapata, a small town in the Muñecas Province.

Site 
The city of Iskanwaya was built on two platforms on an area of 0.6 square kilometers and was notable for its running water. More than one hundred large buildings of an average of thirteen rooms have survived. Mollo streets ran in east-west direction. Their houses were rectangular and grouped around patios, they were built with blocks of slate stone, joined with mud trench mortars. Agriculture patterns included terracing and irrigation.

UN-archaeologist Alvaro R. Fernholz Jemio suggests that in its time the site was inhabited by 2,500 to 3.000 people

Mollo Culture
The Iskanwaya ruins go back to the Mollo culture which predated the Inca civilization and whose people presumably built the constructions as early as 800 BC or in their prime cultural period from 1145 to 1425.

References

External links 

Iskanwaya

Archaeological sites in Bolivia
Former populated places in Bolivia
Buildings and structures in La Paz Department (Bolivia)